Zalkind or Salkind (Russian: Залкинд) is a name for

 Alexander Salkind (1887–1940), Austrian journalist
 Alexander Michailowitsch Salkind (1921–1997), film producer
 Alexander Veniaminovich Zalkind (1866-1931), Russian medician
 Aron Borissovich Zalkind (1888–1936), Soviet psychoanalyst
 Ber Zalkind (1878-1944), Lithuanian painter
 Evgeny Mikhailovich Zalkind (1912-1980), Russian historian und orientalist
 Ilya Alexandrovich Salkind (* 1947), film producer
 Ivan Abramovich Zalkind (1885–1928), Soviet diplomat
 Lazar Borisovich Zalkind (1886–1945), Soviet chess composer
 Michael Yakovlevich Salkind (1890–1974), film producer 
 Milton Zalkind (1916–1998), US-american pianist
 Rosalia Zemlyachka Salkind (1876–1947), Soviet politician
 Semyon Ilyich Zalkind (1879–1940), Soviet politician
 Semyon Rafailovich Zalkind (1869–1941), Russian medician
 Semyon Yakovlevich Zalkind (1903-1976), Soviet biologist 
 Shneur Zalkind (1887–1959), Jewish poet
 Yankev-Meyer Zalkind (1875-1937), British rabbi
 Vera Salkind alias Véra Flory (1907-?), French actress

See also
 Zalkind Hourwitz (1751–1812), Polish emigrant in France

de:Salkind
fr:Salkind
ru:Залкинд